Luzviminda "Luz" Calolot-Ilagan is a Filipina development worker and former congresswoman. She represented the Gabriela Women's Partylist in the 14th Congress of the Philippines from 2007 to 2016.

In September 2017, she was appointed by President Rodrigo Duterte as Undersecretary for Legislative Liaison Affairs and Special Presidential Directives in the Mindanao Region of the Department of Social Welfare and Development.

Early life and career

Luzviminda Ilagan is the wife of Atty. Laurente "Larry" Ilagan. She was appointed city councilor during the Cory Aquino administration, and elected in the 1998 elections.

She was the recipient of the Datu Bago Awards in 2007.

Batasang Pambansa bombing

Congresswoman Ilagan was injured in the 2007 bombing of the Philippine House of Representatives Building, along with Negros Oriental Congressman Pryde Henry Teves, whose eardrums and legs were damaged severely. Congressman Wahab Akbar of Basilan was killed.

See also
 Ninotchka Rosca
 Liza Maza

References

External links
Luzviminda Ilagan, Gabriela, in the House of Representatives
Gabriela Women's Party official website
GABRIELA
 

Living people
Year of birth missing (living people)
Women members of the House of Representatives of the Philippines
Members of the House of Representatives of the Philippines for Gabriela Women's Party
Socialist feminists
21st-century Filipino women politicians
21st-century Filipino politicians